"The Pavilion on the Links" (1880) is a short story by Robert Louis Stevenson. It was first published in Cornhill Magazine (Vol. 42, Sept-Oct 1880). A revised version was included in New Arabian Nights (1882).

The story was considered by Sir Arthur Conan Doyle in 1890 as "the high-water mark of [Stevenson’s] genius" and "the first short story in the world". Along with a number of other stories it was collected in a volume entitled New Arabian Nights in 1882. This collection is seen as the starting point for the history of the English short story by Barry Menikoff.

Adaptations
The White Circle, a silent film, was released in 1920, starring Spottiswoode Aitken as Bernard Huddlestone, Janice Wilson as Clara Huddlestone, Harry Northrup as Northmour, and John Gilbert as Frank Cassilis.

The Pavilion, a direct-to-video release, came out in 1999, starring Craig Sheffer as Frank Cassilis, Patsy Kensit as Clara Huddlestone, Richard Chamberlain as Huddlestone, and Daniel Riordan as Northmour.

Notes

External links

 "The Pavilion on the Links", illustrated by Gordon Browne. 1913.
 

 

1880 short stories
Short stories by Robert Louis Stevenson
Works originally published in The Cornhill Magazine
Short stories adapted into films